Eino Grön, born January 31, 1939, is a Finnish American singer known for his performance of a wide range of popular music styles, including Tango, jazz, and spiritual music. Grön was born at the island of Reposaari in Pori but has lived the last 30 years mainly in Palm Beach, Florida.

Grön made his first recording in 1958 and he is one of the most iconic persons in the Finnish popular music scene. Grön is best known as a tango singer but his styles vary from Finnish schlager to jazz and spiritual music, such as traditional Christmas songs. He has made recordings with many other artists like Argentine tango musicians and Finnish jazz clarinet player Antti Sarpila. Grön's discography includes 28 studio albums and several compilations.

In 2001 Grön received the Pro Finlandia Medal of the Order of the Lion of Finland.

Discography

Studio albums
1969: Tangoserenadi – Eino Grön laulaa 
1971: Rakkaustarinoita
1971: Ikivihreä Eino Grön
1973: Eino Grön laulaa suomalaisia tangoja 
1973: Eino Grön 
1974: Hetki muistoille
1975: Meidän laulumme 
1977: Hartaita lauluja 
1977: Eino Grön mestareiden seurassa 
1983: Merellä ja kotisatamassa 
1984: Tangon kotimaa 
1987: Bandoneon 
1987: Eino Grön
1989: Mustarastas: Suomalaisia laulelmia 
1990: Sininen ja valkoinen
1992: Sulle lauluni laadin 
1992: Kotikirkkoni: Eino Grön laulaa Tuomaslauluja 
1995: Kuinka kaunista on
1997: Vähemmän kiirettä, enemmän aikaa 
1997: Unelmatangoja 
1999: Sinut löysin uudestaan 
2000: Romanttinen Eino Grön 
2000: Lapsuusajan joulu 
2002: Kotikirkkoni
2003: Yötuuli 
2003: Antti Sarpila featuring Eino Grön: Swinging Christmas (vol. 3) 
2004: Antti Sarpila meets Eino Grön: Swingin' n' Singin''' 
2007: Minun jouluniJoint albums with Reijo Taipale
1970: 16 tangoa1973: 16 tangoa 2 
1978: 16 tangoa (1978) 
1978: Toiset 16 tangoa Compilation albums 
1965: Eino Grön (1965)1967: Eino Grön (1967) 
1967: Eino Grön laulaa tangoja 
1974: Romanttinen Eino Grön1978: Parhaat päältä 
1980: Kauneimmat valssit 
1981: Meidän tangomme    
1982: Suomalaisen tangon taikaa   
1988: 28 ikivihreää1993: Parhaat 
1995: 20 suosikkia – Seinillä on korvat 
1997: 20 suosikkia – Tango d'amore 
1998: 20 suosikkia – Tangokavaljeeri 
1998: 20 suosikkia – Soi maininki hiljainen 
2001: Musiikin tähtihetkiä (vol. 16) 
2002: 20 suosikkia – Suudelmin suljetut kirjeet 
2002: 20 suosikkia – Kotona taas2003: Suomi huiput: 20 Hittiä2006: Jokainen päiväni – Kauneimmat lauluni 
2008: Tämä elämä – Kaikkien aikojen parhaat 
2011: Lauluja rakkaudesta –vuosikymmenten suosikit 
2013: Samettisilmäinen tyttöni Featuring 
2021: Hyvät hautajaiset (Pyhimys feat. Eino Grön)

Television specials
1988: Eino Grön – Tangoja ja laulelmia (YLE TV1) with Jaakko Salo Orchestra
1993: Eino Grön 35 (YLE TV1) with Lahden kaupunginorkesteri 
2004: Eino Grön – Taru tangon herrasta, documentary (YLE TV2)
2004: Estradilla: Eino Grön 65'' (YLE TV2)

References

External links 
Eino Grön Official Homepage

1939 births
People from Pori
20th-century Finnish male singers
Pro Finlandia Medals of the Order of the Lion of Finland
Finnish emigrants to the United States
Living people
Finnish tango musicians